"Days of the Week" is a song by Stone Temple Pilots, released as a single from their album Shangri-La Dee Da in 2001. The song also appears on the compilation albums Thank You and Buy This. 

Despite being a moderate rock radio hit, the song did not endure STP's set list, and the last time it was performed in any aspect was a partial performance of the song on November 13, 2001, and the last time the song was played in full was on November 3, 2001.

Composition
The song's lyrics were written by vocalist Scott Weiland about how his heroin addiction affected his relationship with his second wife Mary Forsberg. The song's music was written by guitarist Dean DeLeo and has a much poppier sound than most of the band's previous singles.

Music video
The music video depicts two STPs: one dressed up in white shirts and ties going door-to-door like salesmen or possibly missionaries, and the other taking a journey through space.

Chart performance

References

2001 singles
Stone Temple Pilots songs
Songs written by Scott Weiland
Songs written by Dean DeLeo
Song recordings produced by Brendan O'Brien (record producer)
2000 songs
Atlantic Records singles
Music videos directed by Kevin Kerslake